The División Profesional de la Asociación Paraguaya de Fútbol ("Professional Division of the Paraguayan Football Association"), also known as the Primera División ("first division"), or due to sponsorship reasons Copa de Primera TIGO-Visión Banco, is the top-flight professional football league in Paraguay. Currently, there are 12 teams in the first division.

The most successful club is Olimpia, with 46 championships. The most recent champions are Olimpia, having won the 2022 Clausura tournament. IFFHS ranked the league as the ninth strongest in the world in 2012, and the eleventh strongest in the world in 2013. In 2017, the Primera División returned to 9th position in the world and the 4th from South America, after Brazil (3rd), Colombia (6th) and Argentina (7th), ranking 10th at the end of 2022.

History
Liga Paraguaya's first game was played in 1906, after the director of the El Diario newspaper, Don Adolfo Riquelme, brought to his office on 18 June 1906, the representatives of the five existing football teams in Paraguay at that time (Olimpia, Guaraní, Libertad, General Díaz, and Nacional) to create the governing body of football in Paraguay: the Liga Paraguaya de Fútbol (known today as Asociación Paraguaya de Fútbol). The representatives were William Paats and Junio Godoy (Olimpia) Ramón Caballero, Manuel Bella and Salvador Melián (Guaraní), Juan Escalada (Libertad), César Urdapilleta (General Díaz), and Vicente Gadea (Nacional). The Liga Paraguaya saw Club Guaraní as the first champion in 1906, after defeating Olimpia in the final.

The Primera División was founded in 1906 with 5 teams, and turned professional in 1935 when 10 clubs broke away from the amateur leagues to form a professional league. Since 1996 the format of tournament was changed to Torneo Apertura and Clausura, but since 2008 each tournament is independent.

Traditionally, the dominance of Olimpia and Cerro Porteño went mostly unchallenged for decades. All of this changed at the turn of the 21st century. Since then, Libertad has been the most dominant club, while Nacional and Guarani have also experienced success at the local level.

Format
The system of the tournaments is round-robin. 12 teams play two rounds of 11 dates either away or home games, in total 22 dates in each tournament.  Each year tournaments are divided in two independents tournaments: the Torneo Apertura (Opening Tournament) from February to July, and the Torneo Clausura (Closing Tournament) from July to December.

Relegation is based on an averaging system.  At the end of each season, the two teams with the worst three-year averages are relegated, and the two best teams in the "División Intermedia" (second division) are promoted to Primera División.

International cup participation
Since 2017, Paraguay have eight slots in international cups (four in the Copa Libertadores de America and four in the Copa Sudamericana).  These eight slots will be filled by eight teams.

In the Copa Libertadores, the winner of the Apertura and Clausura tournaments qualify automatically. The third (going into the second round play-off) and fourth (going into the first round play-off) representatives are the best placed non-champion teams from the accumulative table of both the Apertura and Clausura.

In the Copa Sudamericana, the 4th, 5th and 6th best placed teams from the Apertura and Clausura accumulative table qualify for the first stage, alongside the winners of the Copa Paraguay.

Teams
The following are the teams in the first division in 2022:

List of champions
Complete list of champions since 1906. Paraguayan football turned professional since the 1935 season.

Titles by club

Topscorers

Sponsors

Main sponsors  
 Pepsi (1997-1998)
 Brahma (1997-1998) 
 Lloyds TSB (1999-2000) 
 Gillette (2005-2007) 
 Tigo (2008-present) 
 Visión Banco (2010-present)

Current official sponsors  
 Coca-Cola (1987-2004/2011-present)
 Pilsen (1988-2007/2011-present) 
 Caña Fortin 
 Vino Toro 
 Lácteos Trébol
 Lácteos Lactolanda 
 Pastas Anita 
 Supermercado Superseis 
 Supermercado La Bomba
 Supermercado Arete 
 Supermercados Kingo 
 Bein TV (1999-present) 
 DirecTV (1999-present)
 GOL TV (2003-presente)

Former official sponsors  
 Daewoo Motor 
 Suzuki Motor 
 Pirelli
  (2005-2010) 
 Pepsi (1994-1999) 
 Brahma (1995-1999) 
 Budweiser (2007-2008) 
 Multicanal (1996-2006) 
 Nuevo Siglo Cable TV (1996-2007) 
 SKY (2000-2004) 
 Supermercado Real 
 Supermercado Gran Vía
 Supermercado Ycua Bolaños 
 Shopping Multiplaza
 González Giménez

Media coverage

See also
 Football in Paraguay
 Paraguayan football league system
 División Intermedia
 Paraguayan Tercera División
 Paraguayan Primera División B
 Primera División B Nacional
 Paraguayan Cuarta División
 Campeonato Nacional de Interligas
 Unión del Fútbol del Interior
 Paraguayan women's football championship
 Football Federation of the 1st Department Concepción
 Football Federation of the 2nd Department San Pedro
 Football Federation of the 3rd Department Cordillera
 Football Federation of the 4th Department Guairá
 Football Federation of the 5th Department Caaguazú
 Football Federation of the 6th Department Caazapá
 Football Federation of the 7th Department Itapúa
 Football Federation of the 8th Department Misiones
 Football Federation of the 9th Department Paraguarí
 Football Federation of the 10th Department Alto Paraná
 Football Federation of the 11th Department Central
 Football Federation of the 12th Department Ñeembucú
 Football Federation of the 13th Department Amambay
 Football Federation of the 14th Department Canindeyú
 Football Federation of the 15th Department Presidente Hayes
 Football Federation of the 16th Department Alto Paraguay
 Football Federation of the 17th Department Boquerón

References

External links
 RSSSF
 Paraguayan Football Association Official website

      
1
Paraguay
Football